Vukale Stanišić (1761) was possibly the guvernadur of Montenegro in the period between 1758 and 1764.

A judgment from June 3, 1761, written by "Vukale Stanišić" (Писах ја Вукале Станишић по ријечи вишереченијех), points to that Vukale was the guvernadur, as the guvernadur signed first in civil cases. The surname also supports this, Stanišić being a patronymic pointing to Staniša (Stanislav) – the previous guvernadur Stanislav Radonjić.

References

Prince-Bishopric of Montenegro